Deirdre Clune (born 1 June 1959) is an Irish politician who is a Member of the European Parliament (MEP) from Ireland for the South constituency. She is a member of Fine Gael, part of the European People's Party.

She previously served as a Senator for the Cultural and Educational Panel from 2011 to 2014, a Teachta Dála (TD) for the Cork South-Central constituency from 1997 to 2002 and 2007 to 2011 and Lord Mayor of Cork from 2005 to 2006.

Early life
Clune was educated at Ursuline Convent Cork, and went on to graduate from University College Cork in 1980, with a B.E. in Civil Engineering. She completed a diploma in Management Engineering at Trinity College Dublin in 1983 and returned to UCC in 1996 to complete her HDip in Environmental Engineering.

Political career
Clune was first elected to Dáil Éireann at the 1997 general election succeeding her father, Peter Barry who was retiring. Her grandfather Anthony Barry had also been a TD, making her a third generation member of the Dáil. In the Dáil, she was appointed Fine Gael front bench spokesperson on Arts, Heritage, Gaeltacht and the Islands in June 2000 and spokesperson on Environmental and Consumer Affairs from February 2001.

She lost her seat at the 2002 general election. She also contested the 2002 elections to the 22nd Seanad on the Industrial and Commercial Panel, but was unsuccessful.

She was a member of Cork City Council from 1999 to 2007 and became the 68th Lord Mayor of Cork on 27 June 2005.

Clune regained her Dáil seat at the 2007 general election. She was appointed deputy spokesperson on Enterprise with special responsibility for Innovation from 2007 to 2010. In July 2010, she was appointed as party spokesperson on Innovation and Research.

She lost her seat at the 2011 general election to party colleague Jerry Buttimer. She was subsequently elected to Seanad Éireann on the Cultural and Educational Panel in April 2011, where she served as Fine Gael Seanad spokesperson on Enterprise, Jobs and Innovation.

At the 2014 European Parliament election, she was elected for the South constituency. She was re-elected at the 2019 European Parliament election for South but took the fifth and final Brexit seat, so she did not take her seat until after the United Kingdom left the European Union on 31 January 2020.

See also
Anthony Barry
Families in the Oireachtas

References

External links

Deirdre Clune's page on the Fine Gael website
Deirdre Clune's page on the VoteWatch website

 

1959 births
Living people
Alumni of Trinity College Dublin
Alumni of University College Cork
21st-century women MEPs for the Republic of Ireland
Fine Gael MEPs
Fine Gael TDs
Local councillors in Cork (city)
Lord Mayors of Cork
Members of the 24th Seanad
21st-century women members of Seanad Éireann
Members of the 28th Dáil
Members of the 30th Dáil
20th-century women Teachtaí Dála
21st-century women Teachtaí Dála
Women mayors of places in Ireland
Fine Gael senators
MEPs for the Republic of Ireland 2014–2019
MEPs for the Republic of Ireland 2019–2024